Annals of Piacenza or Chronicle of Piacenza may refer to:

Guelph Annals of Piacenza (1031–1235), Latin, written by Giovanni Codagnello
Ghibelline Annals of Piacenza (1154–1284), Latin, anonymous
Chronica Placentina (to 1370/4), Latin, written by Pietro da Ripalta

See also
 Piacenza (disambiguation)